The Secret Series is a series of 'secret'-themed fantasy adventure novels written by Pseudonymous Bosch (Raphael Simon). The series centers on three middle school children: Cass, Max-Ernest, and Yo-Yoji; and their adventures as members of the Terces Society, a group that seeks to prevent a mysterious "Secret" from being discovered by the villainous organization of alchemists, the Midnight Sun.

The Secret Series is inspired by Lemony Snicket's A Series of Unfortunate Events and targeted at middle-school-aged readers.

A film is currently in development.

Plot 

In The Name of This Book Is Secret, a real estate agent for the deceased named Gloria finds a mysterious box called "The Symphony of Smells" in a dead magician's house, which she drops off at Cass' grandfather's junk store. Cass takes the Symphony of Smells to school with her the next day. That day, while she investigates the reason for a rat dying in her schoolyard, she meets Max-Ernest, who talks too much, loves jokes, and has divorced parents. Max-Ernest tries out one of his jokes on Cass, who tells him that his joke doesn't make sense, thus fostering a conversation between the two.

Cass shows Max-Ernest the Symphony of Smells, and they decode a message for help hidden inside it. Cass and Max-Ernest decide to visit the dead magician's house to find out why he needed help. Now collaborators, Cass and Max-Ernest go to investigate the dead magician's house and find the magician's mysterious journal hidden in his secret study. However, Gloria comes in with a young couple looking for a house - Ms. Mauvais and Dr. L. This couple is looking for the magician's journal and when they see the kids leaving with it, they follow Cass and Max-Ernest and utter threats for hours, however the kids end up escaping.

After reaching home, the kids discover a mysterious riddle on the first page of the journal, which piques their curiosity, but unfortunately, the rest of the pages are blank, leaving them wondering about the purpose of the journal. Cass solves the riddle on the way to school the next day, discovering that the magician's story is written underneath the double-layered pages of the journal. She and Max-Ernest read the story and discover that Pietro Bergamo's brother Luciano was stolen by a beautiful blonde woman with a voice like ice when they were children. Pietro and Luciano were synesthetic circus performers. Pietro believed that the Golden Lady, as he called the beautiful blonde woman, was kidnapping synesthetic children, for some reason, discovering that a young Chinese violinist with the condition was kidnapped years later by the same woman. After reading, Cass believes that the Golden Lady is Ms. Mauvais, but Max-Ernest points out that this is impossible, as the story took place decades ago when she could not even have been born.

Meanwhile, an emergency is taking place at the school - Benjamin Blake has disappeared. Cass believes it was Dr. L and Ms. Mauvais who took the boy, having seen them inquiring about Benjamin's art earlier at her school and having seen them jet off in a limousine printed with the words, "Midnight Sun Sensorium and Spa". However, Cass and Max-Ernest get into a fight, thus being unable to work together to find Benjamin, but Cass believes it's her responsibility to save Benjamin.

After looking through some spa brochures collected by her mother, Cass decides to pose as one of the Skelton Sisters, socialites, and heiresses and calls The Midnight Sun spa to pick her up in a limousine. She is picked up by Daisy and is greeted by Dr. L when she arrives. Cass then meets Owen, a stuttering young man who is to be her butler during her stay. After being subject to several spa treatments, Cass goes looking for Benjamin Blake, only to end up in Ms. Mauvais' office, where Ms. Mauvais tells her that there will be a surprise guest coming for dinner.

The surprise guest is none other than Max-Ernest, who came to save Cass. Ms. Mauvais demands to be given the magician's journal and in the commotion that takes place after she discovers several pages are missing (they were missing for Cass and Max-Ernest, as well), her glove slips off, revealing the hand of a woman older than the kids have ever seen before. Cass and Max-Ernest realize that all of the Midnight Sun members are extremely old, as they are alchemists on a search for the Secret, which they believe will give them immortality.

The kids soon find out that Dr. L is Luciano, Pietro's long-lost brother. Cass and Max-Ernest and locked in their room, but Owen reveals himself as a spy and unties the children, asking them to tie him up, instead. They go to the pyramid in the center of the spa grounds through a secret tunnel in Ms. Mauvais's office and see that Dr. L and Ms. Mauvais are about to remove Benjamin's brain in front of a crowd of hundreds of Midnight Sun members. They throw in scent bottles from the Symphony of Smells spelling out "help" and Dr. L goes mad, believing his brother, Pietro Bergamo, has come to him. However, as Dr. L begins to run up the pyramid, the kids, afraid that he will see them, throw a rope down the hole in the top of the pyramid to climb down. However, the rope catches fire, forcing them to enter the room differently. The Midnight Sun Spa is burned down by the fire caused by the rope. Cass and Max-Ernest manage to save Benjamin and are driven home by Owen.

They then return home with Owen, having accomplished their task. A while later, Gloria drops off more boxes from the magician's house, and at the bottom the kids receive useful gadgets from a secret sender named P.B.

In the second book, we see that for 500 years, the secret society of the Midnight Sun has been waiting for the homunculus, the man-made man, to rise, and now the evil Dr. L and Ms. Mauvais are going to throw Cass and Max-Ernest to the sharks unless they tell them where he resides. After going on an excursion with their science teacher, the two are tricked by Dr. L after receiving a note from Pietro saying he will meet them on a ship, from which they barely escaped. After finding out their teacher is Owen, the accent-changing member of the Terces Society, they have introduced to the great magician himself, Pietro, who gives them a mission.

The mission is to find the homunculus before the Midnight Sun does. Max-Ernest also finds out that 'Terces' is a "secret" backward. Cass is grounded when she returns home because she was missing for too long. While on the Midnight Sun ship, Cass and Max-Ernest discover a strange ball (also called the sound prism), which enables her to hear all types of sounds by putting it to her ear and making wonderful music when thrown in the air carefully. Cass also discovers a birth certificate. The name is unrecognizable, thus making Cass wonder if she was the wrong girl that the Terces Society wanted. She ignores it, even though it pains her, and continues her mission. Later Cass finds out she is adopted and was delivered in a box on her grandfathers' doorstep.

This time teaming up with a new classmate named Yoji (who prefers to be called Yo-Yoji), the three need to escape the grasp of their parents and find the alchemist's grave. Cass convinces her grandparents to take her, Max-Ernest, and Yo-Yoji camping to find the homunculus. When they find the homunculus, they take it back to Terces, but it runs away when he finds out they don't have good food. Meanwhile, Amber gets to meet the Skelton Sisters, who are in cahoots with Midnight Sun, and they ask her to do something for her.

Later that night, Amber is hidden in Cass's bushes, and Cass hears noises. She goes outside and plays the Sound Prism, thinking it's Mr. Cabbage Face. Amber records the song from the sound prism, which attracts the homunculus, and gives it to the Skelton Sisters. They play it at a concert and end up trapping the homunculus and Cass. They end up back near Whisper Lake, where they went camping. The Midnight Sun took there because Lord Pharaoh, the nasty man who created Mr. Cabbage Face, the homunculus, a grave is there, and with it, all of his alchemist things, which is what Ms. Mauvais and Dr. L want to help their mission in receiving immortality.

The Midnight Sun and Terces Society members engage in combat because the Midnight Sun had captured Cass and Mr. Cabbage Face, the while Max-Ernest and Yo-Yoji are up on a mountain, with the Sound Prism and a whip. They plan to create a sonic boom with it, make the mountain avalanche onto the Midnight Sun and seal the coffin in the ground. When a huge boulder falls off the mountain from the sonic boom, Cass and Mr. Cabbage Face, now freed, are trying their efforts to put the coffin back in the grave, but Mr. Cabbage Face screams to Cass to get out of the way because the boulder was heading towards her. He pushes her out of the way, and Mr. Cabbage Face gets crushed into the ground with the coffin. The homunculus dies and is sealed with his maker in that grave forever. Midnight Sun members disperse, but not before Dr. L can have a nice chat (surprisingly) with his brother/old friend. In the end, Max-Ernest, Cass, and Yo-Yoji take the Oath of Terces, created by the Jester, the homunculus' only friend 500 years ago, and Cass's real great, great, great, great... great-grandfather.

Association with the five senses

Each book targets one of the five senses. Additionally, the plot of each book contains an item or object that relates to the sense the book surrounds.

References

External links

 

Book series introduced in 2007
American fantasy novel series
Novels by Pseudonymous Bosch
Young adult novel series